Csólyospálos is a village in Bács-Kiskun county, Hungary.

References

External links
 Official homepage

Populated places in Bács-Kiskun County